The Presidential Award is a decoration established by President Siaka Stevens to honour Sierra Leoneans in recognition of "diligent and dedicated services" to Sierra Leone.

History 
The medal was established in 1972 by President Siaka Stevens, and ranks below the Orders of the Republic and the Rokel. It is awarded in gold and silver classes.

A ceremony where the President of Sierra Leone presents the insignia takes place annually on Independence Day, 27 April.

Notable recipients

Gold

 Ahmadiyya Mission, 2013 
 Alhaji Alie Menjor Sesay, 2014 – Trade.
 Alhaji Alusine Largbo, 2014 – Trade.
 Alari Francess Shaw, 2014 – Government.
 Brima Mazola Kamara
 Catholic Relief Services (CRS), 2013
 Combined Artists Wan Pot Comedians, 2013 
 Cordelia Jean Marian Sankoh – Music.
 Edmund Foday Kabba, 2013
 Emmerson Bockarie, 2013
 Ernestine Constance Omorlade Macaulay, 2014 – Civil Service and the Public Sector.
 ENCISS (Enhancing the Interface between State & Civil Society), 2013
 Fatmata Juliet Tarawally, 2014 – Judiciary.
 Hassan Michael Gibateh, 2014 – Education.
 Isatu Ashmao Daramy, 2014 – Diplomacy.
 Kadiatu Conteh – Trade.
 Kelvin Doe, 2013
 Marian Mackie Scott, 2014 – Music.
 Mariatu Kargbo, 2014 – Culture.
 Mildred Abioseh Solomon, 2014 – Judiacy.
 Michael Ngegba, 2014 – Fisheries.
 Mohamed Momodu Bangura, 2014 – Railway work.
 Mohamed Kallon, 2013
 Momoh Bangura, 2013 – Assistant Superintendent of the Sierra Leone Police Force.
 Momoh Mohamed Kamara, 2014 – Artisan industry.
 Nabie Dumbuya, 2014 – Philanthropy.
 Prince Kuti-George, 2013
 Princess Modupeh Pearce, 2013
 Sherene Ranasinghe, 2014 – Diplomacy.
 Sue Ray, 2014 – Aviation.
 The Single Leg Amputee Sports Association (SLASA) – Amputee Sports.
 Umaru Bangura, 2017
 UN Women, 2015

Silver

 Aaron Aiah Boima, 2014 – Trade.
 Abdul Hakin Hamid, 2014 – Nation Fire Force.
 Abdulair Fornah, 2014 – Sierra Leone High Commission UK.
 Alimamy Morlai bangura, 2014 – National Fire Force.
 Brima Kamara, 2014 – Civil Service.
 Brima Mazzola Kamara, 2018 – for contributions to athletics.
 Fatmara Binta Kabba, 2014 – Civil service.
 Haja Ya Alimamy Conteh, 2013
 Janday Momoh, 2013
 Margaret Charley, 2013
 Millicent Rhodes, 2013
 Mohamed A. Nabay – Trade and vocational education.
 Salamatu Kamara – Fishery.
 Sgt. (Rtd.) Daniel F. Kargbo, 2013 – RSLAF.
 Wilhemina John, 2013

See also 
 Order of the Republic
 Order of the Rokel

References 

1972 establishments in Sierra Leone
Awards established in 1972
Orders, decorations, and medals of Sierra Leone